Solomon Enclave is three historic homes located at Beverly Shores, Porter County, Indiana.  The three two-story, International Style flat-roofed dwellings were built in 1948.  They are rectangular in plan and are built into the sides of dunes.  The houses features cantilevered concrete decks that overlook Lake Michigan.

It was listed on the National Register of Historic Places in 2011.

References

Houses on the National Register of Historic Places in Indiana
International style architecture in Indiana
Houses completed in 1948
Houses in Porter County, Indiana
National Register of Historic Places in Porter County, Indiana
National Register of Historic Places in Indiana Dunes National Park